Juan Manuel Saladino (born 28 September 1987) is an Argentine field hockey player. He represented his country at the 2016 Summer Olympics, where he won the gold medal.

References

1987 births
Living people
Argentine male field hockey players
Field hockey players at the 2016 Summer Olympics
Olympic field hockey players of Argentina
Olympic gold medalists for Argentina
Olympic medalists in field hockey
Medalists at the 2016 Summer Olympics
South American Games gold medalists for Argentina
South American Games medalists in field hockey
Competitors at the 2006 South American Games